The Camerini d'alabastro (little rooms of alabaster) are a range of rooms built over the Via Coperta in Ferrara, northern Italy, linking the Castello Estense to the Palazzo Ducale. They may have included the studiolo or little study of Alfonso I d'Este, Duke of Ferrara.

Further reading
Bayer, Andrea, in Dosso Dossi: Court Painter in Renaissance Ferrara, 1998, Metropolitan Museum of Art (New York, N.Y.), J. Paul Getty Museum, pp. 31–40
Freedman, Luba, Classical Myths in Italian Renaissance Painting, 2011, pp. 44–48, Cambridge University Press, 9781107001190, google books
Jaffé, David (ed), Titian, The National Gallery Company/Yale, London 2003, pp. 101–111

Buildings and structures in Ferrara
Alabaster
Individual rooms